Carrión de los Céspedes is a city located in the province of Seville, Spain.

References

External links
Carrión de los Céspedes - Sistema de Información Multiterritorial de Andalucía

Municipalities of the Province of Seville